Yadgir Legislative Assembly constituency is one of the 224 Legislative Assembly constituencies of Karnataka state in India.

It is part of Yadgir district.

Members of the Legislative Assembly 
Hyderabad State

 1952 - Jagannath Rao Chandriki, Indian National Congress.

Mysore State 

 1957 - Baswantaraya, Independent.
 1962 - Mahantswami Verupakshaya (Bhoj Raja), Lok Sewak Sangh.
 1967 - Vishwanath Reddy Mudnal, Independent.
 1972 - Vishwanath Reddy Mudnal, Independent.

Karnataka State 

 1978 - Sharnapa Nagappa Kalburgi, Indian National Congress.
 1983 - Vishwanath Reddy Mudnal, Janata Party.
 1985 - Vishwanath Reddy Mudnal, Janata Party.
 1989 - Dr A B Malakaraddy, Indian National Congress.
 1994 - Dr A B Malakaraddy, Indian National Congress.
 1999 - Dr A B Malakaraddy, Indian National Congress.
 2004 - Veer Basawanthreddy Mudnal, Independent.
 2008 - Dr A B Malakaraddy, Indian National Congress.
 2013 - Dr A B Malakaraddy, Indian National Congress.
 2018 - Venkatreddy Mudnal, Bharatiya Janata Party.

Results

2018 
Polling Date: 12 May 2018

Counting Date: 15 May 2018

Declaration of Result Date: 15 May 2018

Polling Station: Number: 266

Average Electors per Polling Station: 886

2013 
Polling Date: 05 May 2013

Counting Date: 11 May 2013

Declaration of Result Date: 11 May 2013

Polling Station: Number: 223

Average Electors per Polling Station: 855

2008 
Polling Date: 22 May 2008

Counting Date: 25 May 2008

Declaration of Result Date: 25 May 2008

Polling Station: Number: 181

Average Electors per Polling Station: 948

Date(s) of Re-Poll, If any: 24 May 2008

Number of Polling Stations where Re-Poll was ordered: 1

2004 
Polling Date: 20 April 2004

Counting Date: 13 May 2004

Declaration of Result: 13 May 2004

Polling Station: Number: 173

Average Electors per Polling Station: 949

Date(s) of Re-Poll, If any: 22 April 2004

Number of Polling Stations where Re-Poll was ordered: 2

1962 
Polling Date: 19 Feb 1962

Electors: 58250

Voters: 31179

Polling percentage: 53.53%

Valid votes: 29660

Previous results

See also 
 List of constituencies of the Karnataka Legislative Assembly
 Yadgir district
Yadgir (Lok Sabha constituency)

References

Yadgir district
Assembly constituencies of Karnataka